Her Fighting Chance is a 1917 American silent drama film. Directed by Edwin Carewe, the film stars Jane Grey, Thomas Holding, and Percy G. Standing. It was released in May, 1917.

Cast
 Jane Grey as Marie
 Thomas Holding as Jan Thoreau
 Percy G. Standing as Corporal Blake
 Edward Porter as Sergeant Fitzgerald
 Fred Jones as François Breault
 William Cohill as Pastamoo

References

American silent feature films
American black-and-white films
Silent American drama films
1917 drama films
1917 films
Films based on works by James Oliver Curwood
Films directed by Edwin Carewe
1910s English-language films
1910s American films